Stichting MIND is a mental health charity in the Netherlands founded in 2016.

The event was promoted by Queen Máxima on her Instagram account.

MIND started a petition to the Dutch Senate for reduction of cost of mental health help for the youth.

References 

Health charities in the Netherlands